I Do, Redo is a Canadian reality television series that premiered on March 22, 2020 on CTV. Hosted by celebrity influencer Jessica Mulroney, the series profiles couples whose weddings went badly due to circumstances outside of their control and features Mulroney and designer Caspar Haydar designing an opportunity for them to redo the ceremonies.

On June 10, the show was abruptly cancelled following allegations that Mulroney threatened Sasha Exeter, a black female writer and influencer over social media. The episode that aired on April 19, 2020 was made the final episode.

References

English-language television shows
CTV Television Network original programming
2020s Canadian reality television series
2020 Canadian television series debuts
2020 Canadian television series endings
Wedding television shows
Canadian dating and relationship reality television series
Television series by Insight Productions